Dimitrios Markos (born 13 September 2001) is a Greek swimmer. He competed in the men's 200 metre freestyle at the 2020 Summer Olympics.

References

External links
 

2001 births
Living people
Greek male freestyle swimmers
Swimmers from Athens
Olympic swimmers of Greece
Swimmers at the 2020 Summer Olympics
Mediterranean Games gold medalists for Greece
Mediterranean Games silver medalists for Greece
Mediterranean Games medalists in swimming
21st-century Greek people
Swimmers at the 2022 Mediterranean Games